John Henry Horton, known as Jack Horton (15 February 1866 – 28 December 1946) was an English footballer who played in the English Football League and the 1895 FA Cup Final for West Bromwich Albion. He also played for Burslem Port Vale and Wednesbury Old Athletic. His brother Ezra was also a footballer, and was a teammate of many years at West Brom.

Career
Horton, a player able to play either as a defender or as an attacker, began his career at Oak Villa. He represented Wednesbury Old Athletic, before joining up with West Bromwich Albion. Whilst with West Brom he also played at least four friendly matches for Burslem Port Vale, scoring three goals, between April 1884 and December 1885. All three of his goals came in a 6–1 win over Wednesbury Town on 5 April 1884.

He made his league debut on 8 September 1888, at full-back for West Bromwich Albion in a 2–0 win against Stoke at the Victoria Ground. He played 19 of the "Throstles" 22 Football League matches and was part of a defence-line that achieved three clean-sheets whilst restricting the opposition to a single goal on four occasions. He played 129 league games in the English Football League from 1889 to 1897, including 19 of the club's 22 games in the league's inaugural season. The club's best finish in his time there was fifth place in 1889–90. He appeared in the 1895 FA Cup Final at Crystal Palace, and unsuccessfully battled with Aston Villa's Jack Devey in a goalmouth scramble just some 30 seconds into the game; despite this, the goal was credited to Bob Chatt. It proved to be the only goal of the game.

Style of play
Horton was described in one source as a grand full-back who could never be faulted when it came to resolute tackling and clearing his line, which he did in fine style.

Career statistics
Source:

Honours
West Bromwich Albion
FA Cup runner-up: 1895

References

1866 births
1946 deaths
Sportspeople from West Bromwich
English footballers
Association football defenders
Association football forwards
Wednesbury Old Athletic F.C. players
West Bromwich Albion F.C. players
Port Vale F.C. players
English Football League players
FA Cup Final players